Singapore is a 1947 American film noir crime romance film directed by John Brahm and starring Fred MacMurray and Ava Gardner. The film was remade as Istanbul (1957) with the location moved to Turkey, and Errol Flynn and Cornell Borchers in the starring roles.

Plot
Pearl smuggler Matt Gordon (Fred MacMurray) finds romance with Linda Grahame (Ava Gardner) just before the start of World War II. He proposes to her, and she accepts. However, when the Japanese attack Singapore, the church where she is waiting to marry him is bombed; Gordon searches frantically in the wreckage, but cannot find her. He is forced to sail away on his schooner.

With the end of the war, Gordon returns after five years, and is met by Deputy Commissioner Hewitt (Richard Haydn), who is convinced he has returned for a hidden cache of pearls. So are Gordon's old criminal associates, Mr. Mauribus (Thomas Gomez) and his underling Sascha Barda (George Lloyd). Mauribus offers to buy the pearls, but Gordon denies he has any.

Then, to his shock, Gordon sees Linda, but she does not remember him or anything prior to waking up in a hospital during the war. After spending years together in a prison camp with plantation owner Michael Van Leyden (Roland Culver), and now known as Ann, she married him. Gordon tries to help her remember her past, but to no avail. She does, however, go to see Linda's pre-war servant, Ming Ling (Maylia). Ming Ling recognizes her, but Linda's memories are still blocked.

Giving up, Gordon retrieves the pearls from his old hotel room, and hides them in the luggage of the current occupants, American tourists Mr. and Mrs. Bellows (Porter Hall and Spring Byington). Hewitt questions and searches him after seeing him exit the room, but discovers nothing. However, he informs Gordon that Ann Van Leyden is missing.

Gordon goes to Mauribus. He deceives Mauribus and Sascha into believing that Linda double-crossed him and has the pearls. They take him, at gunpoint, to her. He pulls out a gun taped to his ankle, and dispatches the two crooks. In the excitement, Ann is knocked unconscious. Gordon takes her back to her husband.

The blow restores Ann's memories. She is willing to resume her life with Michael, but he confesses he knew all about her past. With her happiness in mind, he drives her to the airport. When they arrive, not only is Gordon's luggage thoroughly searched, but so are the bags of the Bellows. Giving up, he tells Hewitt where the pearls are. Hewitt lets him board the aircraft, which takes off just before Linda arrives. Spotting her, Hewitt has the aircraft return, and Ann runs out onto the tarmac to meet it.

Cast
 Fred MacMurray as Matt Gordon
 Ava Gardner as Linda 
 Roland Culver as Michael Van Leyden
 Richard Haydn as Deputy Hewitt
 Spring Byington as Mrs. Bellows
 Thomas Gomez as Mr. Mauribus
 Porter Hall as Mr. Bellows
 George Lloyd as Sascha Barda
 Maylia as Ming Ling
 Holmes Herbert as Rev. Barnes
 Edith Evanson as Mrs. Barnes
 Frederick Worlock as Cadum
 Lal Chand Mehra as Mr. Hussein
 Curt Conway as Pepe (as Kurt Conway)

Production
Principal photography on Singapore took place from February 26 to late April 1947, primarily in and around Palmdale, California.

Reception

Critical response
The New York Times film critic Bosley Crowther was merciless in his review, "Ava Gardner is sultry and empty-headed as the script demands. Mr. MacMurray doesn't ever appear to have his heart in what he is doing, and Spring Byington and Porter Hall as the tourists from the Midwest conduct themselves in the time-honored fashion that is supposed to denote slightly-addled American transients. 'Singapore' is a pretty poor excuse for an entertainment, even as minor league jewel-smuggling fare."

Film historian Leonard Maltin, however, considered the film, "... (an) alluring drama of trader/pearl smuggler MacMurray returning to Singapore after a five-year absence, recalling his previous romantic relationship with Gardner. He thinks she was killed during a Japanese bombing attack, but she really was a victim of amnesia. The characters in this seem to be very loosely modeled after those in Casablanca".

Film critic Dennis Schwartz was also more positive in his later review.  He wrote, "John Brahm (The Lodger/Hangover Square/The Locket) directs with flair an exotic thriller inspired by Casablanca. It was remade in 1957 as Istanbul with Errol Flynn ... There's a Casablanca-like ending at the airport, with the chief inspector showing he has a heart and that true love between the adventurers can't be denied no matter what. The thriller had fine production values, terrific atmosphere, and Ava and MacMurray were in great form."

References

Notes

Bibliography

 Gardner, Ava. Ava: My Story. New York: Bantam, 1990. .
 Maltin, Leonard. Leonard Maltin's Movie Guide 2009. New York: New American Library, 2009 (originally published as TV Movies, then Leonard Maltin’s Movie & Video Guide), First edition 1969, published annually since 1988. .

External links
 
 
 

1947 films
1947 romantic drama films
American romantic drama films
American black-and-white films
Film noir
Films about amnesia
Films directed by John Brahm
Films scored by Daniele Amfitheatrof
Films set in Singapore
Universal Pictures films
American war drama films
1940s war drama films
American World War II films
Romantic crime films
1940s English-language films
1940s American films